"I'm Like a Bird" is a song by Canadian singer-songwriter Nelly Furtado. It was written by Furtado and produced by Gerald Eaton and Brian West for her debut studio album, Whoa, Nelly! (2000). Released as the album's first single in September 2000, it became a worldwide hit the following year, peaking at number one in Portugal, number two in Australia and New Zealand, number five in the United Kingdom, and number nine in the United States. It was the eighth-most-played song on Canadian radio in 2001.

In 2002, "I'm Like a Bird" was nominated for the Grammy Award for Song of the Year and won the Grammy Award for Best Female Pop Vocal Performance, making Furtado the first female act to win the award for her debut single since Mariah Carey did so ten years earlier and the last to be awarded to a Canadian in the category. It also won the Juno Award for Single of the Year in 2001.

Composition
"I'm Like a Bird" is composed common time in the key of B♭ major. The song moves at 90 beats per minute, and Furtado's voice spans around two octaves, from F3 to F5. It is written in verse-chorus form, with a bridge before the third chorus.

Furtado's response
In 2006, Furtado said of the song, "I've heard it sung at karaoke or by cover bands and it was awesome — I was like, wow, I've got one of those songs. Somebody once called it a 'hairbrush song', one that girls and guys sing in front of the mirror with their hairbrush. I just think I'm lucky I have it — it's paying the bills!".

Music video
The music video for "I'm Like a Bird" was directed by Francis Lawrence, and features heavy use of CGI. The video begins in the sky where the camera slowly pans down onto Furtado, who is lying in the grass. It then shows her singing on a tree trunk in mid-air. In the chorus she gets up and starts singing to the camera while birds are flying around her. The second verse shows her sitting in mid-air in a forest, while singing to the camera. The chorus consists of flashes of Furtado singing in mid-air, again, while leaning on the tree trunk. During the bridge she is singing to a bug while her eyes change colour, which changes the bug's color accordingly. The conclusion of the video shows her falling backwards from a branch into a crowd as she sings the final chorus of the song. The last shot pans out to reveal a crowd of tens of thousands.

There was an edited version of the music video for European VH1, where some scenes were changed.

Track listings

Credits and personnel
Credits are adapted from the Whoa, Nelly! album booklet.

Studios
 Recorded and engineered at The Gymnasium (Toronto, Canada) and Can-Am Recorders (Tarzana, Los Angeles)
 Mixed at Can-Am Recorders (Tarzana, Los Angeles)
 Mastered at Classic Sound (New York City)

Personnel

 Nelly Furtado – writing, lead vocals, background vocals, production
 Gerald Eaton – micro-synth guitar, programming, production
 Mike Elizondo – bass guitar
 Russ Miller – drums
 Allan Molnar – vibraphone
 Brian West – production, programming, recording, engineering
 Brad Haehnel – pepper shaker, mixing, recording, engineering
 John Knupp – second engineering
 Scott Hull – mastering

Charts

Weekly charts

Year-end charts

Certifications

Release history

Notes

References

1999 songs
2000 debut singles
2001 singles
DreamWorks Records singles
Grammy Award for Best Female Pop Vocal Performance
Juno Award for Single of the Year singles
Music videos directed by Francis Lawrence
Nelly Furtado songs
Number-one singles in Portugal
Songs about birds
Songs written by Nelly Furtado